Dorottya Faluvégi (born 31 March 1998) is a Hungarian female handballer for Győri ETO KC and the Hungarian national team.

Achievements
IHF Women's Junior World Championship: 
Winner: 2018
Magyar Kupa:
Winner: 2017, 2021
Hungarian Championship
Winner: 2022

Individual awards
 Junior handball player of the year in Hungary: 2016
 All-Star Right Wing of the Junior World Championship: 2018

Personal life
Her brother, Rudolf Faluvégi is also a professional handball player.
In 2020 she graduated from the Budapest University of Technology and Economics under the Faculty of Economic and Social Sciences, earning a BSc degree in Business and Management. She got married in 2022.

References

External links

1998 births
Living people
Handball players from Budapest
Hungarian female handball players
Ferencvárosi TC players (women's handball)
Győri Audi ETO KC players